Yaroslav Vadimovich Gladyshev (born 5 May 2003) is a Russian football player. He plays for FC Dynamo Moscow.

Club career
He made his debut for the main team of FC Dynamo Moscow on 22 September 2021 in a Russian Cup game against PFC Dynamo Stavropol. He scored his team's fifth goal in a 6–0 victory. He made his Russian Premier League debut for Dynamo on 22 October 2021 against FC Khimki.

On 15 December 2022, Gladyshev extended his contract with Dynamo until 2026.

Personal life
His father Vadim Gladyshev also played football professionally, he appeared in the Russian Premier League for FC Lada-Tolyatti.

Career statistics

Club

References

External links
 
 
 

2003 births
Sportspeople from Kirov, Kirov Oblast
Living people
Russian footballers
Russia youth international footballers
Russia under-21 international footballers
Association football forwards
FC Dynamo Moscow players
Russian Premier League players
Russian Second League players